Rudolf Komorous (born 8 December 1931, Prague, Czechoslovakia) is a Czech-born Canadian composer. His works include Twenty-Three Poems about Horses (1978), based on the poetry of Li Ho, the opera No no miya (1988) which uses elements of Noh theatre and the Li Ch’ing Chao Madrigals (1985).

References

1931 births
Canadian classical composers
Czech classical composers
Czech male classical composers
Living people
Czech opera composers
Male opera composers
Prague Conservatory alumni
Academic staff of Simon Fraser University
Academic staff of the University of Victoria